The Dhaka International Book Fair, formerly the Dhaka Book Fair is a book fair held in Bangladesh's capital city Dhaka. It is one of the most prominent book fairs in Bangladesh, apart from Amar Ekushey Bookstella. Usually the fair is organised in every December. The place to organise this fair is not specific.

Details 
In addition to Bangladesh, other publications from the world India, Iran etc. also appear in publications by their publishing houses. Sometimes foreign stalls represent any organisation or organisation without representing specific countries. Most of the foreign stalls are not kept for sale, but are displayed only. There are no specific themes each year. The place of fair is not specific, sometimes Shilpakala Academy in the premises, Never in Dhaka University is played in the playground, sometimes Suhrawardy Udyan A few publishing houses publish new books on the occasion of this fair. Commission is available in a certain amount (usually 25%) of the book.

Fair also has more seminars, concerts, new book clippings and various discussion programs. Tickets for the fair are available for the ticket, the ticket is to be purchased with the specified entry price. However, in the management of any institute, students can enter the group without any ticket.

History 
The country's first national book center was the "National Book Center" in independent Bangladesh, and the fair was held 1972 from 20 December, to 27 December in Bangla Academy The fair was sitting in the courtyard. In addition to the publishing houses of Bangladesh, publishing companies from eight countries took part in the fair. International seminar was organised on the occasion of the fair. However, the current fair is being held in 1995 from AD. Since then, this fair was organised 14 times in the name of Dhaka Book Fair. 2008 This fair is being organised in the extended range from the year Dhaka International Book Fair.

See more 
 Ekushey Book Fair

References

External links 
 Official website

Book fairs in Bangladesh
Cultural festivals in Dhaka
Bengali language movement